Gloria Hoppins (born 1955) is an American artist associated with the Gee's Bend group of quilters.

Her work is included in the collection of the Brooklyn Museum.

Life 
Born in Gee's Bend, Hoppins' parents were Linda and Richard Pettway. Hoppins comes from a rich lineage of quilt-makers, such as her grandmother, Virginia Pettway, her mother, Linda Pettway, and her sister Lucy L. Witherspoon. She remains active in her community, singing in the gospel choir group Ye Shall Know the Truth.

References

1955 births
20th-century American women artists
20th-century American artists
Quilters
Artists from Alabama
Living people
21st-century American women